East Richwoods is an unincorporated community in Stone County, Arkansas, United States. The H.S. Mabry Barn, which is listed on the National Register of Historic Places, is located in East Richwoods.

References

Unincorporated communities in Stone County, Arkansas
Unincorporated communities in Arkansas